Diversification may refer to:

Biology and agriculture
 Genetic divergence, emergence of subpopulations that have accumulated independent genetic changes 
 Agricultural diversification involves the re-allocation of some of a farm's resources to new products or non-agricultural activities

Economics and finance
 Diversification (finance) involves spreading investments 
 Diversification (marketing strategy) is a corporate strategy to increase market penetration
 Diversification of firms through mergers and acquisitions

Other uses
 Diversified technique, a chiropractic method

See also
 Diversity (disambiguation)